Oshkosh Area School District is a school district located in Oshkosh, Wisconsin. It has about 10,000 students and operates 13 elementary schools, five middle schools, two high schools, and three charter schools. The district is governed by a seven-person Board of Education which is elected at large for three-year terms, as well as a superintendent of schools. The current board president is Bob Poeschl, and the current superintendent is Dr. Bryan Davis.

Schools

High schools
Oshkosh North High School
Oshkosh West High School

Middle schools
Carl Traeger Middle School
Merrill Middle School
Perry Tipler Middle School
South Park Middle School
Webster Stanley Middle School

Elementary schools
Carl Traeger Elementary School
Emmeline Cook Elementary School
Franklin Elementary School
Jefferson Elementary School
Lakeside Elementary School
Merrill Elementary School
Oaklawn Elementary School
Oakwood Environmental Education Charter School
Read Elementary School
Roosevelt Elementary School
Shapiro STEM Academy
Washington Elementary School
Webster Stanley Elementary School

Charter schools 
 ALPs Charter School
 Oakwood Environmental Education Charter School
Shapiro STEM Academy

Former schools
Oshkosh East High School was an alternative high school in Oshkosh.  Established in 2004, it was located in a leased building on Washington Avenue that also housed the Journeys Charter School.  The school had about 80 enrolled students; together with its related New Start program, it served about 100 students.  The school was the subject of some controversy because of its low graduation rate. The school had about ten staff members. It was closed in June 2010 amid public concern over increased class sizes at North and West high schools and proposals to consolidate middle and elementary schools in the district due to financial troubles.

References

External links 
Oshkosh Area School District School Site

School districts in Wisconsin
Oshkosh, Wisconsin
Education in Winnebago County, Wisconsin